Software testing life cycle may refer to:

 Software testing
 Software development life cycle
 Software release life cycle